Tse-Addo (also known as East La) is a suburb of Labadi and a residential area in the Greater Accra Region of Ghana. It is located behind the Ghana International Trade Fair, La.

Institution 

 Tse Addo Police Post

References 

Greater Accra Region
Communities in Ghana